Shalabh Mani Tripathi (born 1 December 1977) is a former Indian TV journalist, turned politician of the Bhartiya Janata Party who is an elected member from Deoria Assembly constituency in 2022 in Deoria district of Uttar Pradesh.

Early life and career

He was born on 1 December 1977 in Deoria district of Uttar Pradesh. His father was a government teacher.

In 1998, after completing Post Graduation in mathematics he joined Dainik Jagran as a journalist.

In December 2016 he joined Bhartiya Janata Party.

Tripathi previously worked with Dainik Jagran, Amar Ujala, and News 18.

References

External links
 Official Website

1977 births
Living people
People from Deoria, Uttar Pradesh
Bharatiya Janata Party politicians from Uttar Pradesh
Uttar Pradesh MLAs 2022–2027
Indian journalists
Indian political people